Bernhard Hoëcker (born Bernhard Hoecker-von Mühlenfels; 20 March 1970) is a German comedian, actor and television presenter. He is best known for the spoof show Switch, as well as being a permanent member of the previous Genial guessing team (2003–2011) Genial Daneben.

Biography

Hoëcker grew up in Frankfurt. At the age of 10, he moved to Bonn with his family. He finished his Abitur (equivalent of the US high school diploma) at the Clara-Schumann-Gymnasium. Between 1993 and 1996, Hoëcker studied economics up to intermediate diploma level (German: Vordiplom) at the University of Bonn and quit his studies thereafter.

Hoëcker works on German broadcasters as comedian and actor.

Hoëcker is married, has two daughters and lives with his family in Bonn. However, as Hoëcker pointed out in the program Missverstehen Sie mich richtig (Translated:) "Do you misunderstand me correctly", this statement is not correct. He did, however, not specify which part of the statement was not correct.

In his free time, he does geocaching, among other things.

Works

Filmography 
 2001: Du oder keine
 2004: Germanikus
 2005: Der Clown
 2006: Die ProSieben Märchenstunde
 2006: Ab durch die Hecke (German voice of Verne)
 2006: Cedric (short films, German voice of Cedric)
 2008: Spiel mir das Lied und du bist tot!
 2008: Morgen, ihr Luschen! Der Ausbilder-Schmidt-Film
 2010: Für immer Shrek (German voice of Rumpelstilzchen)
 2011: Robin Hood (musical video by Edguy)
 2013: Badaboom (musical video by Van Canto)
 2014: Danni Lowinski: Alles futsch

 Shows (as a regular) 
 1997–2000: Switch (broadcaster ProSieben)
 2001: C.O.P.S. – Die Pannenshow (with Ingolf Lück, broadcaster Sat1)
 2003–2011: Genial daneben – Die Comedy Arena (Sat1)
 2004–2011: Schillerstraße (Sat1)
 2006: Was denkt Deutschland? (moderation, Sat1)
 2007–2012: Switch reloaded (ProSieben)
 2010: Ent-oder-Weder! (ZDFneo)
 2012–2013: Nicht nachmachen! (ZDF)
 2013: Durchgedreht! (ZDF)
 since 2014: Kaum zu glauben! (NDR)
 since 2014: Ohne Garantie (ZDF)
 since 2014: Vier sind das Volk (ZDF)

 Shows (as guest) 
 Blondes Gift (2001, 3 August 2002)
 Die Pisashow Clever! – Die Show, die Wissen schafft NightWash Das Quiz mit Jörg Pilawa (2001, Prominentenspecial, 18 March 2004)
 Anke Late Night (2004, episode: 1.14, 10 June 2004)
 Wer wird Millionär? (2004, Prominentenspecial, 25 November 2004)
 Das große Prominenten-Turnen, 19 May 2005
 Extreme Activity (2007)
 Johannes B. Kerner (2007)
 Peppers – Das Comedycamp (3 May 2008)
 Verbotene Liebe, August 2008
 Löwenzahn (November 2008)
 Star-Quiz (8 October 2009, 13 August 2011)
 Ladykracher (Gastrollen)
 Super-Champion (21 April 2012, 25 August 2012)
 Jetzt wird's schräg (25 July 2014)
 Das ist spitze (18 December 2014)

 Discography 

 Albums 
 Hoëcker, Sie sind raus – Comedy vom Kleinsten 2007: Aufzeichnungen eines Schnitzeljägers 2007: Ich hab's gleich DVD 
 2008: Ich hab's gleich - Live! Bibliography 
 Aufzeichnungen eines Schnitzeljägers: Mit Gëocaching zurück zur Natur, Rowohlt Verlag, 2007, 
 Meilenweit für kein Kamel: Eine ungewöhnliche Reise vom Allgäu in den Orient, Rowohlt Verlag, 2010, 
 Wir sind Deutschland!: Ein illustrer Streifzug durch die deutsche Geschichte, Lappan Verlag, 2011, 
 Hoëckers Entdeckungen: Ein merkwürdiges Bilderbuch längst vergessener Orte, riva Verlag, 2011, 
 Am schönsten Arsch der Welt: Bekenntnisse eines Neuseelandreisenden, Bastei Lübbe, 2012, 
 Neues aus Geocaching: Geschichten von draußen'', traveldiary Verlag, 2014,

References

External links 
 Official website

German male comedians
German male film actors
1970 births
Living people
German male television actors
20th-century German male actors
21st-century German male actors
People from Neustadt an der Weinstraße
Sat.1 people
ARD (broadcaster) people